The 1989 Arena Football League season was the third season of the Arena Football League (AFL). The league champions were the Detroit Drive, who defeated the Pittsburgh Gladiators in ArenaBowl III.

Standings

y – clinched regular-season title

x – clinched playoff spot

Playoffs

Milestones
On July 21, the Denver Dynamite defeated the Detroit Drive, 15–14, for what is the lowest scoring game in league history.

Awards and honors

Regular season awards

All-Arena team

Team notes

References